Klara Bauer (23 June 1836 in Swinoujscie – 29 June 1876 in Breslau) was a Polish novelist. Often writing under her pseudonym Karl Detlef, she was best remembered for her novels Bis in die Steppe (1869), Unlösliche Bande (1869), Schuld und Sühne (1871), Mußte es sein? (1873), Auf Capri (1874), Benedikta (1876), and Die geheimnisvolle Sängerin (1876).

References 

1836 births
1876 deaths
Polish writers
Polish novelists